Alexander Sitkovetsky (born 1983) is a British violinist.

Biography

Family
Sitkovetsky was born in Moscow to a musical family; his father being guitarist and composer Alexander Sitkovetsky of the Autograph fame, mother Olga Sitkovetsky being a pianist, he is the nephew of violinist Dmitry Sitkovetsky.

Musical Studies
Aged eight, he appeared as a soloist in Montpellier, and he was subsequently invited to enroll at the Yehudi Menuhin School. He studied there with Natalya Boyarskaya and Hu Kun.
He has participated in master classes with Yehudi Menuhin, Dmitry Sitkovetsky, Mauricio Fuks, György Pauk, Maya Glezarova, Zvi Zeitlin, Abram Stern, Oleksandr Semchuk, and Maxim Vengerov.
Sitkovetsky is still studying, under Pavel Vernikov in Vienna.

Performer
Sitkovetsky performs as a soloist around the world and also records. He is part of the Sitkovetsky Trio.

References

External links
 Official Website
 Biography at his agent's page
 NY Times page

1983 births
British violinists
British male violinists
Living people
Russian emigrants to the United Kingdom
21st-century violinists
21st-century British male musicians